Vinod Santoshkumar Agrawal is an Indian politician. He was elected to the Maharashtra Legislative Assembly from Gondiya in the 2019 Maharashtra Legislative Assembly election as an Independent candidate. Previously, he was associated with Bharatiya Janata Party. Later on 23 June he again joined BJP in between 2022 Maharashtra political crisis.

References 

1969 births
Living people
Bharatiya Janata Party politicians from Maharashtra
People from Gondia
Maharashtra MLAs 2019–2024